Nina Lauwaert (born 6 August 1988) is a Belgian long-distance runner.

In 2019, she competed in the women's event at the 2019 European 10,000m Cup held in London, United Kingdom. In 2020, she competed in the women's race at the 2020 World Athletics Half Marathon Championships held in Gdynia, Poland.

References

External links 
 

Living people
1988 births
Place of birth missing (living people)
Belgian female long-distance runners
Belgian female marathon runners